Pusheta Creek is a stream located entirely within Auglaize County, Ohio.

Pusheta Creek was named after an Indian chief who settled there.

See also
List of rivers of Ohio

References

Rivers of Auglaize County, Ohio
Rivers of Ohio